Oliva julieta is a species of sea snail, a marine gastropod mollusk in the family Olividae, the olives.

Distribution
This species occurs in the Pacific Ocean from Costa Rica to Peru.

References

 Vervaet F.L.J. (2018). The living Olividae species as described by Pierre-Louis Duclos. Vita Malacologica. 17: 1-111

julieta